The women's BMX freestyle competition of the cycling events at the 2019 Pan American Games was held on August 11 at the Circuito BMX.

Schedule

Results

Seeding
8 riders from 8 countries was started

Final

References

Cycling at the 2019 Pan American Games
BMX at the Pan American Games